Liberating Technologies, Inc., better known as LTI, is a research and development company owned by Coapt, LLC and based in Holliston, Massachusetts.

LTI specializes in research and development with a research funding portfolio supported by the Department of Defense, National Institutes of Health, Veteran's Administration, and other entities.

Additionally, it is known for the Boston Digital Arm, the first microcontroller-equipped hand prosthesis.

In 2021, LTI was purchased by Coapt, LLC, a leader in myoelectric pattern recognition.

References

External links 
Liberating Technologies website.
College Park - Research.

Prosthetic manufacturers
Technology companies based in the Boston area
Companies based in Middlesex County, Massachusetts
Holliston, Massachusetts
Manufacturing companies established in 1999
Technology companies established in 1999
1999 establishments in Massachusetts